Conwell is a surname. Notable people with the surname include:

Angell Conwell (born 1983), American actress and model
Carolyn Conwell, American actress
Ernie Conwell (born 1972), American football player
Esther M. Conwell (born 1922), physicist who studied properties of semiconductors and organic conductors
Henry Conwell (1745–1842), Roman Catholic clergyman
Joe Conwell (born 1961), American football player
Leon M. Conwell, American journalist and politician
Nula Conwell (born 1959), British-born character actress with strong Irish family ties
Russell Conwell (1843–1925), American Baptist minister, orator, philanthropist, lawyer, and writer
Tommy Conwell, American guitarist, songwriter and performer
Tony Conwell (born 1932), English footballer
Wilfred Conwell Bain (born 1908), American music educator and an opera theater director

See also
Conwell-Egan Catholic High School, coeducational Catholic high school in Fairless Hills, Pennsylvania
Gordon–Conwell Theological Seminary (GCTS) is an evangelical theological seminary in South Hamilton, Massachusetts